Zeltia is a former Spanish pharmaceutical company which operated through a variety of subsidiaries in the pharmaceutical and chemical industries.  As of 2007, Zeltia's research activities in the pharmaceutical area had not resulted in a marketed product. However, the company's majority shareholder and chairman are the same person, which has relieved the pressure which many CEOs have experienced to produce immediate returns.

History
In 1993 Zeltia sells its subsidiary Cooper-Zeltia taking the name CZ Veterinaria, which years later would be renamed Zendal.

The company was taken over by its subsidiary Pharma Mar in a reverse takeover, keeping the Zeltia's Group structure.

In 2018 PharmaMar sells Xylazel to the Dutch company AkzoNobel.

In 2019 PharmaMar sells Zelnova, the group's last subsidiary in Galicia, to the Galician investment company Allentia Invest for 33 million euros.

Subsidiaries
Direct subsidiaries as of 2009 were: Pharma Mar, S.A.U.; Genómica, S.A.U.; Zelnova, S.A; Protección de Maderas, S.A.U; Xylazel, S.A.; Noscira, S.A.; Sylentis, S.A.

Indirect subsidiaries which are direct subsidiaries of Pharma Mar as of 2009 were: Pharma Mar US; Pharma Mar AG; PharmaMar S.A.R.L.; Pharma Mar GmbH; Pharma Mar Ltd.

A single indirect subsidiary is a direct subsidiary of Zelnova, that being Copyr, S.p.A.

References

Financial

History

Pharmaceutical companies established in 1939
1939 establishments in Spain
Companies based in the Community of Madrid
Pharmaceutical companies of Spain
Chemical companies of Spain
Companies listed on the Madrid Stock Exchange
Companies based in Galicia (Spain)